Saville is a surname.

Saville may also refer to:

SAVILLE, a Type 1 encryption algorithm
Saville (novel) by David Storey which won the Booker Prize for fiction in 1976
Saville Township, Perry County, Pennsylvania

See also
Saville Dam, a dam in Barkhamsted, Connecticut
Saville Theatre, London
Saville Report on the Bloody Sunday shootings (Northern Ireland, 1972)